Emanuel Reynoso may refer to:

Emanuel Alberto Reynoso (born 1983), Argentine footballer
Emanuel Reynoso (footballer, born 1995), Argentine footballer